John or Jack Carney may refer to:

People

Politics
 John Carney (Delaware politician) (born 1956), Governor of Delaware and former U.S. Representative
 John Patrick Carney (born 1976), Democratic member of the Ohio House of Representatives
 John Carney (Kentucky politician) (1969–2021), member of the Kentucky House of Representatives

Sports
 John Carney (American football) (born 1964), American football placekicker
 Jack Carney (baseball) (1866–1925), professional baseball player
 Jack Carney (footballer) (1909–1981), Australian rules footballer

Other people
 John Carney (director) (born 1972), Irish film and TV director
 John Carney (magician) (born 1958), sleight of hand artist, author and actor
 John Carney (radio), radio talk show host on KTRS in St. Louis
 John F. Carney (born 1941), chancellor of Missouri University of Science and Technology

Places 
 John Carney House
 John Carney Agricultural Complex

See also
Jonathan Carney,  violinist, violist, and conductor